The University of East London Docklands Campus is a campus of the University of East London (UEL) situated in the Docklands area of east London. The campus opened in 1999. It is one of two campuses in UEL, the other being the Stratford Campus.

The campus is adjacent to the Royal Albert Dock, closed to commercial shipping since the 1980s and now largely used as a water sports centre and rowing course, see London Regatta Centre. The Cyprus station of the Docklands Light Railway is directly connected to the pedestrian spine of the campus, and offers links to Canary Wharf and central London.

London City Airport is directly opposite the campus, on the other side of the Royal Albert Dock. The distinctive rounded halls of residence buildings can be seen from across the dock.

Docklands was London's first new university campus to be built in over half a century. The Business School will incorporate the Petchey Centre for Entrepreneurship, named in honour of its benefactor, entrepreneur Jack Petchey.

References

External links
UEL Docklands Campus webpage
University of East London 2012

Docklands
Buildings and structures in the London Borough of Newham
University and college campuses in the United Kingdom